George Alan Knew (born 5 March 1954) is a former English cricketer.  Knew was a right-handed batsman.  He was born at Leicester, Leicestershire.

Knew made his first-class cricket debut for Leicestershire against Oxford University in 1972.  He made three further first-class appearances the following season in the County Championship against Nottinghamshire, Essex and Derbyshire.  In his four first-class matches, he scored 59 runs at an average of 11.80, with a high score of 25.  He made a single List A appearance against Surrey in the John Player League, ending the match unbeaten on 42, though Leicestershire still lost by 23 runs.

His father, George Knew senior, also played first-class cricket for Leicestershire.

References

External links
George Knew at ESPNcricinfo
George Knew at CricketArchive

1954 births
Living people
Cricketers from Leicester
English cricketers
Leicestershire cricketers